Metalectra bigallis is a species of moth in the family Erebidae. It is found in North America.

The MONA or Hodges number for Metalectra bigallis is 8501.

References

Further reading

 
 

Boletobiinae
Moths described in 1908